Kegedonce Press is an Indigenous publishing house in Neyaashiinigmiing Reserve No. 27 (Cape Croker), Ontario, Canada, owned by Kateri Akiwenzie-Damm. Started in 1993, it is one of only a handful of dedicated Indigenous publishers in Canada. Their motto is "w'daub awae", which means "speaking true" in Ojibwe. Kegedonce Press describes itself as committed to the publication of beautifully written and designed Indigenous literature, both nationally and internationally. They are the only Indigenous publisher that prioritizes poetry, as Kateri is a poet and recognizes that many new Indigenous authors begin their writing careers as poets.

Indigenous-owned and operated, this literary press publishes work by some of the most widely known contemporary Indigenous writers, including titles by Kateri Akiwenzie-Damm, Joanne Arnott, Warren Cariou, Cherie Dimaline, Al Hunter, Daniel Heath Justice, Basil H. Johnston, Aaron Paquette, and Richard Van Camp.

References

External links
Kegedone Press homepage
Interview, SF Canada, Spring 2008
Native American Resources, Hanksville
Bibliographic Certification, Booknet Canada
Canadian Literature, CanLit Publishers
Kateri Akiwenzie-Damm: Our voices are marginalized - Indian Country Today

Book publishing companies of Canada
First Nations culture
Publishing companies established in 1993
1993 establishments in Ontario